Martin Ågerup (born 1966) is a Danish economist and the current president of the think tank CEPOS. He is a Fellow of the International Policy Network.

Early life and education
Ågerup was born in the town of Birkerød in the northern outskirts of Copenhagen in 1966. He graduated from the European School of Luxembourg IN 1982 and obtained a master's degree in economy and economic history from the University of Bristol in 1991.

Career
From 1992 until 1998 he worked as a researcher at the Copenhagen Institute for Futures Studies and he then worked as a management consultant at  connector a/s from 1998 until 2002. Between 2002 and 2004, he was an independent consultant associated with GCI Future. He is a former member of the Danish European Movement's Executive Committee and a member of its think tank "Yes to Europe". He became president of Cepos in 2004.

Private life
Martin Ågerup is married to Ulla Ågerup with whom he has two children. The family lives in Svogerslev outside Roskilde.

Publications
Ågerup has authored a number of debate books:
 "Dommedag er aflyst – velstand og fremgang i det 21. århundrede", Gyldendal, 1998. 
 "Enerne – om at leve og arbejde i det 21. århundredes første årti". Borgen, 2001. 
 "Den retfærdige ulighed". CEPOS, 2007.

References

20th-century Danish economists
People from Rudersdal Municipality
People from Roskilde Municipality
1966 births
Living people
21st-century Danish economists